Basay, officially the Municipality of Basay,  is a 4th class municipality in the province of Negros Oriental, Philippines. According to the 2020 census, it has a population of 28,531 people.

The town is home to the highly significant Minagahat language, the indigenous language of Southern Negros as listed by the Komisyon ng Wikang Filipino. The language is vital to the culture and arts of the people.

History

Upon its separation from Bayawan in 1971, Basay became Oriental Negros’ westernmost town, with Negros Occidental at its rear. Diocesan chronicles reveal that it was already a far-flung outpost in the nineteenth century. It perked up in the 70s when CDCP and INKO arrived to mine its copper and iron magnetite.

Basay is agricultural, with sugar cane, rice, corn and copra as major crops. Fringing its shoreline is the Mindanao Sea, considered the richest fishing waters in the country.

Three major rivers running parallel from north to south traverse the town. Balatong Point, also known as Punta Tambongon, was the landing site of a submarine bearing the biggest shipment of WWII ammunition for Negros Oriental. The party was headed by Col Jesus Villamor, acting on the personal direction of Gen Douglas MacArthur who was then in Australia.

The coves and shallow caves on the shoreline of Nagbo-alao are said to be enchanted. The Negros cave frog is endemic to Basay. Its Pagatban River is home to the alligator. Bal-os and Cabcaban springs are important sources of potable water as well as sunny picnic sites. Yardahan is a fishing village with fine swimming areas and game-fishing activities.

Basay is approximately a two-hour-and-a-half drive from Dumaguete.

Geography
Basay is located in the south of Negros Island on the coast of the Sulu Sea.

Barangays
Basay is politically subdivided into 10 barangays.

 Actin
 Bal-os
 Bongalonan
 Cabalayongan
 Cabatuanan
 Linantayan
 Maglinao
 Nagbo-alao
 Olandao
 Poblacion

Climate

Demographics

Economy

Education

Public Elementary Schools
 Basay Central Elementary School
 Bongalonan Elementary School 
 Cabalayongan Elementary School 
 Cabatuanan Elementary School 
 Cabigti-an Elementary School 
 Cleomenes Consolacion Fortugaleza Memorial Elementary School (Actin ES) 
 Datag Elementary School
 Don Pablo Carmen Blanco Utzurrum Memorial Elementary School 
 Maglinao Elementary School
 Monsale Elementary School 
 Olandao Elementary School

Public High Schools
 Actin National High School
 Bal-os National High School
 Basay National High School
 Maglinao National High School

References

External links

 [ Philippine Standard Geographic Code]
Philippine Census Information
Local Governance Performance Management System

Municipalities of Negros Oriental